Back on the Bus, Y'all is Indigo Girls' first live album and fourth overall, released in 1991.

Track listing
"1 2 3" (Scott Bland, Bryan Lilje, Chris McGuire, Amy Ray, Cooper Seay) – 4:30
"Tried to Be True" (Ray) – 2:55
"You and Me of the 10,000 Wars" (Emily Saliers) – 4:21
"Prince of Darkness" (Saliers) – 6:00
"Kid Fears" (Ray) – 4:57
"Left Me a Fool" (Saliers) – 5:30
"All Along the Watchtower" (Bob Dylan) – 6:26
"1 2 3" (Studio version) (Bland, Lilje, McGuire, Ray, Seay) – 4:15

Personnel
Indigo Girls
Amy Ray – rhythm guitar, acoustic guitar, vocals
Emily Saliers – rhythm guitar, acoustic guitar, lead guitar, vocals

Additional personnel
Sara Lee –  bass (3, 4, 5, 6)
Barbara Marino – saxophone (6)
Simone Simonton – drums (3)
Scott Bland – drums (1, 2, 5, 8)
Bryan Lilje – bass (1, 2, 8)
Chris McGuire – rhythm guitar, vocals (1, 2, 5, 8)
Cooper Seay – electric guitar, rhythm guitar, vocals (1, 2, 5, 8)

References

Albums produced by Scott Litt
Indigo Girls live albums
1991 live albums
Epic Records live albums